The Small is an epithet applied to:

Bolko II the Small (c. 1312–1368), Duke of Świdnica, of Jawor and Lwówek, of Lusatia, over half of Brzeg and Oława, of Siewierz, and over half of Głogów and Ścinawa
Dionysius Exiguus (c. 470–c. 544), monk who invented the Anno Domini method of dating
Nicholas the Small (c. 1327–1358), Duke of Münsterberg

See also
List of people known as the Little

Lists of people by epithet